British Railways Standard Class 9F steam locomotives Nos 92020-9 were experimentally built with Franco-Crosti boilers, thus forming a subclass.  All ten were built in 1955 at Crewe Works.

Design

The Franco-Crosti boiler took the form of a single cylindrical water drum running along the underside of the main boiler barrel. The standard chimney was still used for exhausting smoke from the fire box and was only used during lighting-up, in normal working the gases went through firetubes inside the preheater drum that led to a second smokebox situated beneath the boiler from which there emerged a chimney on the right-hand side (fireman's), just forward of the firebox. However where more power was needed steam would be sent to the Blast Pipe to draw more air through the firebox.  

Limitations of the British loading gauge meant that the original BR9 boiler had to be reduced in diameter to allow for the preheater drum below it. This new BR9A, later BR12, boiler had a reduced heating surface compared to the original, even with the additional preheater. Without the preheater, there was over  less heating surface.

In the event, the experiment did not deliver the hoped-for benefits, and efficiency was not increased sufficiently to justify the cost and complexity. The Crosti preheaters also proved to be a problem for maintenance, owing to acidic fluegases condensing in the feedwater heater and causing corrosion. Moreover, conditions were unpleasant on the footplate in a cross-wind, this in spite the later provision of a small deflector plate forward of the chimney. These problems led to the subsequent sealing off of the preheater drum, over the period 1959–1961, and the locomotives were then worked conventionally. As a result of this, there was a reduced ability to generate steam, and so their power classification was unofficially reduced from 9F to 8F.

Stock list

Withdrawal 
No. 92028 was the first Franco-Crosti 9F to be withdrawn in October 1966, 92027 followed in August 1967, with the remainder being withdrawn en masse in November 1967. No examples of this class were preserved.

References

Further reading

 
 Richard Derry The Book of the 9F 2-10-0s 
 Gavin Morrison The Power of the 9Fs OPC Railprint 2001 
 H.C.B. Rogers, Riddles and the 9Fs (Ian Allan, 1982)
 

92020
Railway locomotives introduced in 1955
Scrapped locomotives